Marvel Keith Harshman (October 4, 1917 – April 12, 2013) was a college basketball coach, a head coach for forty years in the state of Washington at Pacific Lutheran University, Washington State University, and the University of Washington.

Early years
Born in Eau Claire, Wisconsin, Harshman moved to the Pacific Northwest as a child and graduated from Lake Stevens High School in Lake Stevens, Washington, north of Seattle. He attended Pacific Lutheran University in Parkland, where he lettered thirteen times in four sports and graduated in 1942. Harshman served three years in the U.S. Navy during World War II, then returned to PLU to coach.  he was selected by the Chicago Cardinals in the fifteenth round (134th overall) of the 1942 NFL Draft.

Collegiate career
While at his alma mater (1945–58), Harshman was also the head football coach from 1951 to 1957, compiling a  record, and also led the baseball team for the last five seasons. He moved east to Washington State University in Pullman in 1958 to succeed Jack Friel and coached the Cougars for 13 seasons. When Husky head coach Tex Winter left for the National Basketball Association (NBA) in 1971, Harshman moved across the state to the University of Washington in Seattle. He compiled a  overall record. Pressured by the university administration to step down, Harshman involuntarily retired from coaching at age 67 in 1985, following consecutive conference titles and NCAA tournament appearances.

Honors
Harshman was named Pac-10 Coach of the Year (1982, 1984) and NABC Coach of the Year for Division I basketball (1984).

He was the coach of the gold-medal-winning U.S. team at the 1975 Pan American Games in Mexico City, and served on the U.S. Olympic Committee from 1975 to 1981.  Harshman was enshrined into the Naismith Memorial Basketball Hall of Fame in April 1985 and was a member of the founding class of the National Collegiate Basketball Hall of Fame in 2006.

Head coaching record

Basketball

Football

See also
 List of college men's basketball coaches with 600 wins

References

External links
 
 Sports Reference – Marv Harshman
 Greater Northwest Football Association – Marv Harshman
 Seattle Times obituary
 Sports Press Northwest obituary 
 

1917 births
2013 deaths
American football fullbacks
American men's basketball coaches
American men's basketball players
Basketball coaches from Wisconsin
Basketball players from Wisconsin
College men's basketball head coaches in the United States
College men's track and field athletes in the United States
College track and field coaches in the United States
Naismith Memorial Basketball Hall of Fame inductees
Pacific Lutheran Lutes athletic directors
Pacific Lutheran Lutes baseball coaches
Pacific Lutheran Lutes baseball players
Pacific Lutheran Lutes football coaches
Pacific Lutheran Lutes football players
Pacific Lutheran Lutes men's basketball coaches
Pacific Lutheran Lutes men's basketball players
Sportspeople from Eau Claire, Wisconsin
Washington Huskies men's basketball coaches
Washington State Cougars men's basketball coaches
United States Navy personnel of World War II